Conscience for Change is a book of transcribed lectures by Martin Luther King Jr. that includes five talks King gave in late 1967 for the Canadian Broadcasting Corporation's Massey Lectures. First published by the CBC, the book was later republished as The Trumpet of Conscience with a foreword by his widow, Coretta Scott King.

Dr. King's lectures included in the book are Impasse in Race Relations, Conscience and the Vietnam War, Youth and Social Action, Nonviolence and Social Change, and a live broadcast of Dr. King's 1967 sermon at Ebenezer Baptist Church, A Christmas Sermon on Peace.

See also
Beyond Vietnam

References

1968 non-fiction books
Speeches by Martin Luther King Jr.
Massey Lectures books
Books about activism
Books of lectures